The Taste of Others is a 2000 French film. It was directed by Agnès Jaoui, and written by her and Jean-Pierre Bacri. It stars Jean-Pierre Bacri, Anne Alvaro, Alain Chabat, Agnès Jaoui, Gérard Lanvin and Christiane Millet.

It won the César Award for Best Film, Best Supporting Actor, Best Supporting Actress and Best Writing in 2001, and was nominated for an Academy Award for Best Foreign Language Film.

Plot 
Castella (Bacri) owns a steel factory. He is told that in order to conduct a business with a group of Iranians, he must learn English, so he hires Clara (Alvaro) to teach him. His wife, Angelique (Millet), is an interior decorator who loves her dog and is in the process of working on her sister-in-law's apartment. The couple go to the theatre, where their niece is performing in a production of Bérénice, accompanied by the driver, Bruno (Chabat), and Castella's temporary bodyguard, Franck (Lanvin). While there, he sees Clara, who is an actress. Meanwhile, we learn from Franck and Bruno's conversation that the former was a police officer. After working tirelessly with his partner towards bringing down a seemingly untouchable criminal, their investigation was abruptly ended. Franck had finally suffered enough corruption and quit the force, while the partner he respected never spoke a word about it.

Franck sends Bruno to the bar to buy cigarettes. The barmaid, Manie (Jaoui), remembers having had sex with Bruno, but Bruno regrets that he does not remember her.

Bérénice over, Clara goes to the bar with her friends, including Antoine and Valerie, and their conversation reveals that she is afraid of never working again; after all, she is forty years old. Bruno, whose fiancé is doing an internship in the United States, spends the night with Manie, who, it turns out, sells drugs on the side and is frequently visited by clients. Franck meets Manie through Bruno and they start a relationship.

Previously uninterested in theater and reluctant about seeing a play rather than having dinner in a restaurant, Castella attends another of Clara's performance and develops a fascination with her bohemian lifestyle. He joins her and her friends for lunch and attends an art show where he buys a piece. However, his cultural ignorance and general roughness makes him a laughingstock. At the bar with Clara's friends, they joke with him that Henrik Ibsen is a great comic playwright, as well as other dramatists like Tennessee Williams. Clara confides to her friend Manie that Castella is thick.

Castella's English is poor at first, but he soon makes progress. He and Clara move the classes from his office to an English tea room, and to mark his progress, he writes an awkward poem dedicated to Clara; however, he is dismayed when she says that she does not share the feelings expressed in his poem. One day she waits at the tea room and he doesn't show up. Throughout the film, Bruno practices his flute, which he plays in a band. Later, he gently complains to Manie that he hasn't received news from his girlfriend who has gone to the US for an internship. Finally, the girlfriend tells him that she has, like him, slept with someone else, and also wants to stay in the States. Manie has now developed an intense affair with Franck, to the point that they speak of marriage—jokingly, they say. However, Franck reveals himself to be more and more angry and bothered regarding Manie's drug dealing, which proves to finally end their relationship.

Castella and Angelique are drifting apart, which is made clear when she moves the painting he bought from Clara's friend, she doesn't like it and that it doesn't go with rest of the house. He retorts that he can't stand living in a candy store, referring to Angelique's interior decorating. Clara starts to feel that her friends are taking advantage of Castella and tells him. He tells her that he bought the painting and is working with her friend to redesign the front of his factory not for her but because he truly likes those things. Franck's contract is finished, and Bruno reveals that the corrupt politician he had tried to send to prison was finally caught by his former partner. Bruno says that he thinks the partner was right to stay on the force after all. This leads Franck to drive to Manie's apartment for a reconciliation. From her window, she sees him reach the door to the lobby, but he hesitates and finally drives away. Clara lands the lead part in Hedda Gabler and invites Castella to the opening. Agitated after seeing an empty chair all night, Clara is overjoyed to see him in the audience as she takes her final bow.

Cast 
Jean-Pierre Bacri as Jean-Jacques Castella
Anne Alvaro as Clara Devaux
Alain Chabat as Bruno Deschamps
Agnès Jaoui as Manie
Gérard Lanvin as Franck Moreno
Christiane Millet as Angélique Castella
Wladimir Yordanoff as Antoine
Anne Le Ny as Valérie
Brigitte Catillon as Béatrice Castella
Raphaël Defour as Benoît
Xavier de Guillebon as Weber

Themes 
Speaking to Paris Match in 2004 Agnès Jaoui said ; "I detest mono-cultures. The problem of identity is something very complicated with me. I am profoundly secular, but if I were attacked for being Jewish, I would scream. And I want the right to say I violently condemn the politics of Ariel Sharon, even if it's complex. It's the same thing for Jean-Pierre as it is for me, it is the individual who counts. It's the social dimension of characters that interests us, not their roots or their heredity. I detest the notion of the inward looking group. It's this we tried to say in The Taste of Others.  Whether it is a religious clan or a group of snobs, it's the same in our eyes. It's the same dogma, the same fundamentalism."

Reception 
, the film holds a 98% approval rating on Rotten Tomatoes, based on 60 reviews with an average rating of 7.8/10. The critical consensus states: "The Taste of Others is a fresh, witty comedy about the attraction of opposites. The characters are well-drawn and engaging and their social interactions believable." Metacritic assigned the film a weighted average score of 78 out of 100, based on 24 critics, indicating "generally favorable reviews".

Awards and nominations

Won
César Awards
Best Actor – Supporting Role
Best Actress – Supporting Role
César Award for Best Film
Best Writing
David di Donatello Awards
Best Foreign Film
European Film Awards
Best Screenwriter (Jean-Pierre Bacri and Agnès Jaoui)
Montréal Film Festival
Grand Prix des Amériques (Agnès Jaoui; tied with Innocence)

Nominated
Academy Awards
Academy Award for Best Foreign Language Film
César Awards
Best Actor – Leading Role (Jean-Pierre Bacri)
Best Actor – Supporting Role (Alain Chabat)
Best Actress – Supporting Role (Agnès Jaoui)
Best Director (Agnès Jaoui)
Best Editing (Hervé de Luze)
European Film Awards
Best Film
European Discovery of the Year (Agnès Jaoui)

References

External links 

2000 films
2000s French-language films
2000 comedy-drama films
Best Film César Award winners
Films featuring a Best Supporting Actor César Award-winning performance
Films featuring a Best Supporting Actress César Award-winning performance
Films whose director won the Best Director Lumières Award
Films directed by Agnès Jaoui
Best Film Lumières Award winners
French comedy-drama films
2000s French films